Safe area may refer to:

 Safe area (television), areas of TV picture that can be seen on screens
 Safe area (Bosnian War), areas of Bosnia and Herzegovina under United Nations peacekeeper watch

See also
 Safe operating area